Carol Sutton (June 29, 1933 – February 19, 1985) was an American journalist. She got her journalism degree from the University of Missouri. In 1974 she became the first female managing editor of a major U.S. daily newspaper, The Courier-Journal in Louisville, Kentucky. She was cited as the example of female achievement in journalism when Time named American Women as the 1975 People of the Year. During her tenure at the paper, it was awarded the 1971 Penney-Missouri Award for General Excellence and in 1976 the Pulitzer Prize for Feature Photography for its coverage of school desegregation in Louisville. She is also credited with significantly raising the number of minority reporters on staff.

Sutton knew of her Kentucky Journalism Hall of Fame award at the University of Kentucky before her death in 1985, and was very humbled and honored by it. The family holds a Carol Sutton Memorial Scholarship Award in her honor every year, which has grown from one recipient to eight or twelve. She was the first white woman to be inducted into the National Association of Black Journalists' Hall of Fame.

References

Further reading
 James D. Ausenbaugh, At Sixth and Broadway: Tales From the Glory Days of a Great Newspaper, The Courier-Journal, Mews Publishing Company, 1998.
 Patricia Bradley, Mass Media and the Shaping of American Feminism, 1963–1975, University Press of Mississippi, 2003.
 Mimi O'Malley, It Happened in Kentucky, Morris Book Publishing, Guilford, CT, 2006.
 Kimberly Voss and Lance Speere, "Taking Chances and Making Changes: The Career Paths and Pitfalls of Pioneering Women in Newspaper Management", Journalism & Mass Communication Quarterly, published online March 20, 2014, by SAGE on behalf of Association for Education in Journalism & Mass Communication. 
 Kay Mills, A Place in the News, Columbia University Press, New York, 1990. 
 Marion Marzoff, Up From the Footnote: A History of Women Journalists, Hasting House, New York. 1977.

External links
 The Kentucky Journalism Hall of Fame
 Kentucky Women Remembered

1933 births
1985 deaths
American newspaper journalists
Writers from Louisville, Kentucky
American women journalists
20th-century American women writers
Place of birth missing
20th-century American non-fiction writers
Courier Journal people
Kentucky women writers